Bass is an unincorporated community in Cole County, in the U.S. state of Missouri.

History
A post office called Bass was established in 1890, and remained in operation until 1913. The community has the name of Methdred Bass, an early settler.

References

Unincorporated communities in Cole County, Missouri
Unincorporated communities in Missouri
Jefferson City metropolitan area